Fundación Club Baloncesto Granada, also known as Covirán Granada by sponsorship reasons, is a basketball team based in Granada, Andalusia, Spain that currently plays in Liga ACB.

History

The Fundación CBG was founded in 2006 as an entity associated to basketball club CB Granada, with the aim to promote basketball and other nonprofit activities in the province of Granada.

In 2012, after the dissolution of CB Granada, the entity decided to create a senior basketball team that could replace the defunct club in the city. In its first season, the club promoted to Liga EBA after finishing as runner-up of the Andalusian group of Primera División de Baloncesto.

Two years later, in 2015, Covirán Granada qualifies to the final stage of Liga EBA and finishes winning its group in Albacete, achieving the promotion to LEB Plata, the third tier in Spanish basketball.

On 21 January 2017, Covirán Granada won its first title after defeating HLA Lucentum by 80–74 in the Copa LEB Plata, but failed in the attempt to promote to LEB Oro after being defeated in the semifinals by Sammic ISB.

Granada retained the Copa LEB Plata on 28 January 2018 by winning Fundación Globalcaja La Roda 71–63 after an overtime and promoted to LEB Oro on 14 April 2018 in Pamplona after conquering the title of the 2017–18 LEB Plata.

Sponsorship naming
Tourapp Fundación CBG 2012–2013
Covirán Granada 2013–

Players

Current roster

Depth chart

Season by season

Trophies
LEB Oro: (1)
 2022
LEB Plata: (1)
 2018
Copa LEB Plata: (2)
2017, 2018
Linares, Spain Invitational Game: (1)
 2009

Notable players
 Jesús Fernández
 Nacho Ordín

References

External links
Official website

LEB Oro teams
Former LEB Plata teams
Former Liga EBA teams
Basketball teams established in 2006
Sport in Granada
Basketball teams in Andalusia